Felipe Veras Rodrigues Melo (born 4 August 1975) is a former Brazilian footballer.

Biography
Felipe Veras started his career at hometown and one of the most successful teams in Brazil, Flamengo. He played his only match at Campeonato Brasileiro Série A on 3 December 1995, against São Paulo FC. He also played for the Rio de Janeiro in the state competitions and once at Copa do Brasil.

In 2003, he left for Al-Nasr of Qatar. He then returned to Rio de Janeiro state for Boavista.

In March 2005, he returned to Rio de Janeiro again, for Vasco da Gama.

After released from his 1-year contract with Pelotas of Campeonato Gaúcho, he retired from footballer.

References

External links
 Flamengo at Flaestatistica.com 
 Profile at Futpedia 
 Profile at CBF 

Brazilian footballers
Brazilian expatriate footballers
CR Flamengo footballers
Boavista Sport Club players
CR Vasco da Gama players
Expatriate footballers in Qatar
Expatriate footballers in Malaysia
Association football defenders
1975 births
Living people
Brazilian expatriate sportspeople in Malaysia
Sabah F.C. (Malaysia) players
Footballers from Rio de Janeiro (city)